The Rugby League World Cup 9s (currently known as the Downer Rugby League 9s World Cup for sponsorship purposes) is an international rugby league tournament played in the rugby league nines format of the sport. The competition will be held every four years.

The inaugural World Cup 9s took place on 18 and 19 October 2019 at the Bankwest Stadium in Sydney, New South Wales, Australia. The women's competition was won by the New Zealand Kiwi Ferns and the men's competition by the hosts, .

Results

See also
Rugby league nines
Rugby League World Cup

References

 
Recurring sporting events established in 2019
Rugby league nines
2019 establishments in Australia
2019 in rugby league
World cups